Nea Trapezounta (Nea Trapezunda) is a village and a community of the Katerini municipality. Before the 2011 local government reform, it was part of the municipality of Korinos, of which it was a municipal district. The 2011 census recorded 423 residents in the village. The community of Nea Trapezounta covers an area of 6.547 km2.

History
The village was founded by Pontic Greek refugees from the Of valley in Turkey, and was named after Trabzon (Trapezounta in Greek).

See also
List of settlements in the Pieria regional unit

References

Populated places in Pieria (regional unit)